Browns Island is an island on the Ohio River within the corporate boundaries of Weirton in Hancock County, West Virginia. Browns Island was the site of a coke plant, which was in operation until 1982. The island's landscape is industrial with a small wooded portion at the southern tip.  Griffen Island lies on the Ohio to its southwest.

Browns Island is known to be the site of an ancient Indian burial ground.

References

See also
List of islands of West Virginia

River islands of West Virginia
Landforms of Hancock County, West Virginia
Islands of the Ohio River